Argyresthia arceuthobiella is a moth of the  family Yponomeutidae. It is found in North America, including California and Oregon.

The wingspan is about 7 mm. The forewings are golden yellow with a narrow lead-coloured costal edge, a narrow longitudinal central white streak and a narrow white dorsal edge. The apical third of the wing is overlaid with lead-coloured scales. The hindwings are light silvery fuscous.

The larvae feed on Calocedrus decurrens.

References

Moths described in 1916
Argyresthia
Moths of North America